Extreme Metaphors is a collection of interviews with  the British writer J. G. Ballard, edited by Simon Sellars and Dan O'Hara, and published in 2012.

Overview
The interviews in the book were given between 1967 and 2008 to interviewers or interlocutors including John Gray, Jon Savage, Will Self and Iain Sinclair.

References

2012 non-fiction books
Works by J. G. Ballard
Fourth Estate books
Books of interviews